The Upnor Formation is a geological formation found in the London Basin of southeastern England. It is of Thanetian (Upper Paleocene) age. It lies unconformably on the Thanet Formation for most of its outcrop, but in the west it lies directly on Chalk Group. It is generally overlain either by the Reading Formation or the Woolwich Formation, but locally in north and east Kent it is overlain unconformably by the Harwich Formation. It forms the lowermost part of the Lambeth Group. The type section is at Lower Upnor Pit, north Kent. The formation has provided fossils of the eutherian mammal Arctocyonides arenae.

References

Bibliography 
 

Geologic formations of England
Paleocene Series of Europe
Paleogene England
Thanetian Stage
Sandstone formations
Shallow marine deposits
Paleontology in England
Geology of London